Snodgrassia stenochorda is a species of moth of the  family Tortricidae. It is found in the Philippines on the island of Luzon.

References

	

Moths described in 1928
Archipini